West Is West is a 1920 American silent Western film directed by Val Paul and starring Harry Carey.

Cast
 Harry Carey as Dick Rainboldt
 Charles Le Moyne as Connors
 Ted Brooks as Kirby
 Ed Lattell as Herman Mendenhall
 Otto Nelson as Sim Wigfall
 Frank Braidwood as Billy Armstrong
 Arthur Millett as J.C. Armstrolng
 Adelaide Hallock as Mrs. Armstrong (credited as Adelaide Halleck)
 James O'Neill as Black Beard (credited as Jim O'Neil)
 Scott McKee as Nagle
 Mignonne Golden as Katie Wigfall (credited as Mignonne)
 Jack Dill as Denjy
 Sue Mason as Judith Elliott

See also
 Harry Carey filmography

References

External links

 
 

1920 films
American black-and-white films
1920 Western (genre) films
Films directed by Val Paul
Universal Pictures films
Silent American Western (genre) films
1920s American films
1920s English-language films